Route 105 is a  state highway in southeastern Massachusetts, running from Marion to Halifax in a generally north-south direction. Its southern terminus is at U.S. Route 6 (US 6) in Marion and its northern terminus is at Route 106 in Halifax. Along the way it intersects Interstate 195 (I-195) in Marion and Interstate 495 and US 44 in Middleborough.

Route description

Route 105 begins at U.S. Route 6 in Marion. The highway crosses over I-195 less than a mile into its journey. The highway winds in a westerly direction through Rochester. When the highway enters Long Plain village in Acushnet, the only town in Bristol County on the route, Route 105 turns in a northerly direction. The highway returns into Rochester and enters Lakeville between Little Quittacas and Great Quittacas Ponds. Route 18 joins Route 105 for a  concurrency, running along the western shore of Assawompset Pond. Route 105 then shoots off in a northeasterly direction into Middleborough through the town’s center and, after its intersection with U.S. Route 44, turns in a northerly direction through East Middleborough, going past Oak Point along the way. The highway ends at Route 106 in Halifax west of the town's center.

History
When U.S. Route 44 bypassed Middleborough in the early 1960s, Route 105 took over the former Route 44 as far as Thompson Street, and eventually was extended north along Thompson Street to Halifax.

Major intersections

References

External links

105
Lakeville, Massachusetts
Middleborough, Massachusetts
Halifax, Massachusetts
Marion, Massachusetts
Rochester, Massachusetts
Acushnet, Massachusetts
Transportation in Bristol County, Massachusetts
Transportation in Plymouth County, Massachusetts
U.S. Route 44